Mehin (also Romanized as Mehīn, Mahīn, Mīhan, Mihīn, and Mikhin) is a village in Dodangeh-ye Olya Rural District, Ziaabad District, Takestan County, Qazvin Province, Iran. At the 2006 census, its population was 499, in 130 families.

References 

Populated places in Takestan County